Les Roberts (born July 18, 1937) is an American screenwriter and mystery novelist.

Biography
Roberts was born Lester Roubert, to Lester Nathaniel and Eleanor (Bauch) Roubert in Chicago, Illinois; he changed his name to Roberts in 1968.

Roberts attended the University of Illinois at Champaign-Urbana and Roosevelt University (1954–1956), served in the U.S. Army (1960–1962), and married Gail Medland in 1957; they divorced in 1980. Roberts has two children, Valerie Lynne and Darren Jon, one grandchild, Shea Holland Thompson. He currently lives in Stow, Ohio.

Social views
Roberts became a vegan c. 2012 after watching 'Peaceable Kingdom: The Journey Home' stating:

Writing career
Roberts began his career as a contemporary American mystery novelist after twenty-four years in Hollywood, having written and/or produced more than 2,500 half-hour segments of network and syndicated television. He was the first producer and head writer of The Hollywood Squares, and has written for The Lucy Show, The Andy Griffith Show, The Jackie Gleason Show and The Man from U.N.C.L.E., among others.

Roberts is primarily seen as a regional writer. Though his Saxon series is set in Los Angeles, he is best known for his Milan Jacovich series set in his adopted hometown of Cleveland, Ohio. Jacovich, unlike many single, dashing private eyes of fiction, is a battered, Stroh's-drinking, polka-dancing Slovenian American Vietnam veteran, ex-cop, and former Kent State football star, with a Serbian strong-willed ex-wife and two sons that he sees every other Sunday. Jacovich's working-guy attitude has endeared him to many Cleveland readers.

He is past president of the Private Eye Writers of America and the regular mystery book critic for The Plain Dealer. He has been a professional actor, singer, businessman, teacher and jazz musician.

Bibliography

The Saxon series
 An Infinite Number Of Monkeys (1987 )
 Not Enough Horses (1988 )
 A Carrot For The Donkey (1989 )
 Snake Oil (1990 )
 Seeing The Elephant (1992 )
 The Lemon Chicken Jones (1994 )

The Milan Jacovich series
 Pepper Pike
 Full Cleveland (1989 )
 Deep Shaker (1991 )
 The Cleveland Connection (1993 )
 The Lake Effect (1994 )
 The Duke Of Cleveland (1995 )
 Collision Bend (1996 )
 The Cleveland Local (1997 )
 A Shoot In Cleveland (1998 )
 The Best-Kept Secret (1999 )
 The Indian Sign (2000 )
 The Dutch (2001 )
 The Irish Sports Pages (2002 )
 King of the Holly Hop (2008 )
 The Cleveland Creep (2011 )
 Whiskey Island (2012 )
 Win, Place, or Die (with co-author Dan S. Kennedy) (2013 )
 The Ashtabula Hat Trick (2015 )
 Speaking of Murder (with co-author Dan S. Kennedy) (2016 )

Other
 A Carol for Cleveland (1991 )
 The Chinese Fire Drill (2001 )
 The Scent of Spiced Oranges and Other Stories (2002 )
 We'll Always Have Cleveland (2006 )
 The Strange Death of Father Candy (Dominick Candiotti #1) (2011 )
 Wet Work (Dominick Candiotti #2) (2014 )
 Sheehan's Dog (2022 )

Awards
In 1986 he won the inaugural "Best First Private Eye Novel Contest" for An Infinite Number of Monkeys in 1986. This novel was also nominated for the 1988 Anthony Award for "Best First Novel" and the Shamus Award the same year in the same category. The following year, the initial novel in the Milan Jacovich series was nominated for the 1989 Anthony Award in the "Best Novel" category. Next, Roberts also won the 1992 Cleveland Arts Prize for Literature and has been voted "Cleveland's Favorite Author" by Cleveland.com. The novel The Lake Effect was nominated for the 1995 Shamus Award in the "Best Private Eye Novel" category.

References

External links
 

American television writers
American male television writers
American mystery writers
1937 births
Living people
Writers from Cleveland
American male novelists
American male screenwriters
Novelists from Ohio
Screenwriters from Ohio